Narcisse Yaméogo (born 19 November 1980) is a Burkinabé former professional footballer who played as an attacking midfielder.

Club career
Born in Ouagadougou, Yaméogo began his career in his native Burkina Faso with ASFA Yennenga, before moving to Senegal with Jeanne d'Arc. He then moved to Portugal, where he spent the majority of his career, playing for Braga, Portimonense, Olhanense, Ribeirão, C.F. União and A.D. Camacha, with short spells in Bahrain with Riffa S.C. and Azerbaijan with Mughan FK.

Following his retirement from playing, Yaméogo was an assistant coach of Gabon under manager Paulo Jorge Rebelo Duarte.
In April 2015, he was hired as an assistant coach of Club Sportif Sfaxien under manager Paulo Jorge Rebelo Duarte.

International career
Yaméogo represented Burkina Faso, with which he made his international debut in 1999. He was part of the Burkinabé 2002 African Nations Cup and was recalled for 2010 African Cup of Nations.

References

Living people
1980 births
Sportspeople from Ouagadougou
Burkinabé footballers
Association football midfielders
Burkina Faso international footballers
2002 African Cup of Nations players
2010 Africa Cup of Nations players
2012 Africa Cup of Nations players
Primeira Liga players
S.C. Braga players
S.C. Braga B players
Portimonense S.C. players
S.C. Olhanense players
C.F. União players
ASFA Yennenga players
ASC Jeanne d'Arc players
Burkinabé expatriate footballers
Burkinabé expatriate sportspeople in Senegal
Expatriate footballers in Senegal
Burkinabé expatriate sportspeople in Portugal
Expatriate footballers in Portugal
Burkinabé expatriate sportspeople in Bahrain
Expatriate footballers in Bahrain
Burkinabé expatriate sportspeople in Azerbaijan
Expatriate footballers in Azerbaijan
21st-century Burkinabé people